Ilga Manor is a manor in Skrudaliena Parish, Augšdaugava Municipality in the Selonia region of Latvia. Located southeast of Daugavpils near the Belarusian border, it is currently used as a teaching site by the University of Daugavpils. Renovation of the building was completed in 2012 with the help of a grant from the European Regional Development Fund.

History 
The manor was built in the 1890s by Baltic German architect Wilhelm Neumann and used as a hunting lodge.

See also
List of palaces and manor houses in Latvia

References

External links
  Ilga Manor
  Photographs of Renovated Manor

Manor houses in Latvia
Augšdaugava Municipality
Selonia